Stereotomy is the ninth studio album by The Alan Parsons Project, released in 1985.

Not as commercially successful as its predecessor Vulture Culture, the album is structured differently from earlier Project albums: containing three lengthy tracks ("Stereotomy" at over seven minutes, "Light of the World" at over six minutes, and the instrumental "Where's the Walrus?" running over seven and a half minutes) and two minute-long songs at the end. It is a full digital production and both the LP and CD releases were encoded using the two-channel Ambisonic UHJ format.

The original vinyl packaging was different from all the reissues: it featured more elaborate artwork of the paper sleeve supplied with a special color-filter oversleeve. When inserted, the over-sleeve filtered some of the colors of the artwork, allowing four different variations (two per side). That was supposed to symbolize visual stereotomy. In the reissues, only one variant remained. The artwork was nominated for Best Album Package at the 29th Annual Grammy Awards.

The word "stereotomy" is taken from "The Murders in the Rue Morgue" by Edgar Allan Poe. It refers to the cutting of solid shapes into different forms, and is used as a metaphor for the way that famous people (singers, actors, etc) are 'shaped' by the demands of fame.

At the time of release, Parsons said, "Stereotomy is really our best album in years." However, he and Woolfson noted that the record suffered a lack of record label support.

Stereotomy earned a Grammy nomination in 1987 – for Best Rock Instrumental Performance: Orchestra, Group, or Soloist – for the track "Where's the Walrus?"

Stereotomy marks the final appearance of David Paton on bass – he went on to join Elton John's touring band – and is the first Project release since Tales of Mystery and Imagination not to feature Lenny Zakatek.

Musician reviewer J. D. Considine wrote simply: "Unnecessary surgery."

Track listing 
All songs written and composed by Alan Parsons and Eric Woolfson.

Side 1 
"Stereotomy" (lead vocal John Miles up to 5:11, Eric Woolfson 5:11 to 5:50) – 7:18
"Beaujolais" (lead vocal Chris Rainbow) – 4:27
"Urbania" (instrumental) – 4:59
"Limelight" (lead vocal Gary Brooker) – 4:39

Side 2 
"In the Real World" (lead vocal John Miles) – 4:20
"Where's the Walrus?" (instrumental) – 7:31
"Light of the World" (lead vocal Graham Dye, backing vocal Steven Dye) – 6:19
"Chinese Whispers" (instrumental) – 1:01
"Stereotomy Two" (lead vocal John Miles) – 1:21

Stereotomy was remastered and reissued in 2008 with the following bonus tracks:
<LI>"Light of the World" (backing track) – 6:14
<LI>"Rumour Goin' Round" (demo) – 5:01
<LI>"Stereotomy" (Eric Woolfson guide vocal) – 6:37
<LI>"Stereotomy Two" (backing rough mix) – 1:23

Personnel
Eric Woolfson – pianos, keyboards, vocals
Alan Parsons – additional keyboards, producer
Ian Bairnson – guitars, guitar synth
David Paton – bass
Stuart Elliott – drums and percussion
Richard Cottle – synths and saxes
The Philharmonia Orchestra, leader – Christoffer Warren-Green
Orchestra arranged and conducted by Andrew Powell
Vocals: John Miles, Chris Rainbow, Gary Brooker, Graham Dye, Steven Dye, Eric Woolfson

Charts

Inspirations 
The track "Chinese Whispers" is based on the game of Chinese whispers. It has some snippets of dialogue heavily overlaid on top of each other. The words are taken from Edgar Allan Poe's work Murders in the Rue Morgue:
"...The larger links of the chain run thus – Chantilly, Orion, Dr. Nichol, Epicurus, Stereotomy, the street stones, the fruiterer."

The titles of "Urbania" and "Where's the Walrus?" can be attributed to Lee Abrams, a (then) radio programmer for WLUP Radio (Chicago, IL) and friend of Parsons and Woolfson. Eric Woolfson remembers: "He was really quite inspirational in this album [Stereotomy] in telling us what we'd been doing wrong, in his view, on the previous albums... 'Urbania' was one of the words he came out with during the course of a long conversation. Another title he's responsible for... is 'Where's the Walrus,' the other instrumental, 'cause he was really giving us a hard time, I must tell you: 'Your guitar sounds are too soft, and your whole approach is, you know, slack, and your lyrics—there’s no great lyrics anymore! I mean, where's the walrus? I don't hear the walrus!' Referring, of course, to John Lennon's `I am the Walrus’..."

Abrams is frequently credited on Project recordings as "Mr. Laser Beam" ("laser beam" being an anagram of Lee Abrams).

In popular culture 
A copy of Stereotomy can (very) briefly be seen in The Big Lebowski when Maude tells The Dude to look through her LPs.

"Limelight" was used by NBC Sports for a music video of the 1986 New York Mets during the postgame show of the 1986 World Series after the Mets defeated the Boston Red Sox in Game 7 to win the World Championship.

"Limelight" was used CBC Sports for the closing montage of the 1992 Grey Cup where the 
Calgary Stampeders defeated the Winnipeg Blue Bombers 24-10.  Doug Flutie led 
Calgary to their first Grey Cup title in 21 years.

References 

The Alan Parsons Project albums
Concept albums
1985 albums
Albums produced by Alan Parsons
Arista Records albums